Aleksandr Nikolayevich Vasilyev (born 29 August 1980) is a Russian professional football coach and a former player.

Club career
He played 8 seasons in the Russian Football National League for 4 different teams.

References

External links
 

1980 births
Living people
Russian footballers
Association football midfielders
FC Shinnik Yaroslavl players
FC Sibir Novosibirsk players
FC Luch Vladivostok players
FC Ufa players
FC Moscow players
FC Yenisey Krasnoyarsk players
FC Novokuznetsk players